A by-election was held for the New South Wales Legislative Assembly electorate of Parramatta on 26 October 1898 as the election of William Ferris, with a margin of 4 votes, was overturned by the Election and Qualifications Committee due to "many gross irregularities".

Dates

Results

The election of William Ferris was overturned by the Election and Qualifications Committee due to "many gross irregularities". Ferris was not the endorsed candidate for the 1898 election, however was endorsed for the by-election.

See also
Electoral results for the district of Parramatta
List of New South Wales state by-elections

References

Parramatta
New South Wales state by-elections
1890s in New South Wales